Giovanni Battista Guarini (10 December 1538 – 7 October 1612) was an Italian poet, dramatist, and diplomat.

Life
Guarini was born in Ferrara. On the termination of his studies at the universities of Pisa, Padua and Ferrara, he was appointed professor of literature at Ferrara. Soon after his appointment, he published some sonnets which obtained for him great popularity as a poet. In 1567, he entered the service of Alfonso II d'Este, Duke of Ferrara. After about 20 years of service, differences with the Duke led him to resign. After residing successively in Savoy, Mantua, Florence and Urbino, he returned to his native Ferrara. There he discharged one final public mission, that of congratulating Pope Paul V on his election (1605). He died in Venice, where he had been summoned to attend a lawsuit, aged 73.

He was the father of Anna Guarini, one of the famous virtuose singers of the Ferrara court, the three women of the concerto di donne. She was murdered by her husband in 1598, with the assistance of her brother Girolamo.

Work and influence 

His most notable work, Il pastor fido, had its first dramatic representation in honor of the nuptials of the Duke of Savoy and Catalina Michaela of Austria in 1585 (published in 1590 in Venice; 20th rev. ed., 1602, Venice; Eng. trans. The Faithful Shepherd, 1647). This play, a pastoral tragicomedy about the loves and fates of shepherds and hunters, polished in style, was translated into many languages and became popular during the 17th century. It set the pattern for a code of refinement and gallantry that lasted until the late 18th century.

No poet played a larger role in the flowering of the madrigal in the late Renaissance and early Baroque eras than Guarini. His poems were set more often by madrigal composers than the work of any other poet, even Tasso, who came in a close second; the prolific madrigal composer Philippe de Monte even named one of his collections Il pastor fido after Guarini's most famous work. His popularity was due to his providing texts to composers which were rich with possibilities for word-painting and other easy translations of emotion into music.  One of his poems, the erotic Tirsi morir volea, recounting the amorous encounter of a shepherd and a nymph, was set to music as a madrigal by more composers than any other pastoral poem of the era, including, among others, Andrea Gabrieli, Gioseppe Caimo, Carlo Gesualdo, Luca Marenzio, Benedetto Pallavicino, and Giaches de Wert. Another of Guarini's poems which was set by numerous madrigalists was Cor mio, deh non languire ("Dear heart, I prithee do not waste away").

In addition to his decisive influence on madrigal composers, he was the single largest influence on opera librettists up until the time of Metastasio in the 18th century. He therefore plays an important role in the history of music.

While Guarini's work may be seen as lacking the deep feeling and sentiment of another poet at the Este court, Torquato Tasso, it was precisely this quality which commended it to musical setting at a time when excessive emotionalism had become unfashionable. An example of a setting of his work would be "O come è gran martire" from Libro Terzo dei Madrigali (1592) by Monteverdi.

Other works are:
 Compendio della poesia tragicomica (1601; published again in the 1602 edition of Pastor fido)
 Il segretario, a dialog on the duties of a secretary, and on matters of logic, rhetoric, etc. (1594)
 La idropica, a prose comedy (written about 1584; published 1613)
 Lettere (1593)
 Trattato della politica libertà (Venice, 1818)

Works

Notes

References

External links 

 
 
 
 

Italian Renaissance writers
Italian diplomats
Italian dramatists and playwrights
Italian poets
Italian male poets
Writers from Ferrara
16th-century Italian writers
16th-century male writers
17th-century Italian writers
17th-century Italian male writers
1538 births
1612 deaths
Italian-language poets
Italian male dramatists and playwrights
16th-century Italian poets
16th-century dramatists and playwrights
17th-century Italian poets
17th-century Italian dramatists and playwrights